Fairbury Public Schools is a school district headquartered in Fairbury, Nebraska.

To combat vaping among students in 2019 the district began doing tests of secondary (junior and senior high school) students engaged in extracurricular activities.

Schools
 Fairbury Junior-Senior High School
 Jefferson Intermediate School
 Central Elementary School

References

External links
 Fairbury Public Schools
School districts in Nebraska
Education in Jefferson County, Nebraska